Nothing to Declare is a solo album by pianist Paul Bley recorded in 2003 and released on the Justin Time label in 2004.

Reception

The Allmusic review by Thom Jurek awarded the album 3½ stars, stating: "In all, Nothing to Declare is Bley's best outing for Justin Time thus far. It's simple in its presentation, but labyrinthine in its journeys". All About Jazz said: "Bley's lyricism has never been blunt or simplistic, and Nothing to Declare is nothing to be glossed over with a superficial listen, but it's sufficiently natural that the spontaneous leaps in logic make good sense". Jazz Review noted: "Nothing To Declare, while implying an international theme with its allusion to customs procedures, in fact refers to American standards and blues throughout the CD. Perhaps "nothing to declare" suggests disarming false humility, when the pianist and the listener know full well that Bley has a lot to declare and has been making important musical declarations for half a century."

Track listing
All compositions by Paul Bley
 "Nothing to Declare" - 18:39
 "Breakdown" - 15:47
 "Blues Waltz" - 14:15
 "8th Avenue" - 8:35

Personnel
 Paul Bley – piano

References

Justin Time Records albums
Paul Bley albums
Solo piano jazz albums
2004 albums